Linalool refers to two enantiomers of a naturally occurring terpene alcohol found in many flowers and spice plants. Linalool has multiple commercial applications, the majority of which are based on its pleasant scent (floral, with a touch of spiciness). A colorless oil, linalool is classified as an acyclic monoterpenoid. In plants, it is a metabolite, a volatile oil component, an antimicrobial agent, and an aroma compound. Linalool has uses in manufacturing of soaps, fragrances, food additives as flavors, household products, and insecticides.  Esters of linalool are referred to as linalyl, e.g. linalyl pyrophosphate, an isomer of geranyl pyrophosphate.

The word linalool is based on linaloe (a type of wood) and the suffix . In food manufacturing, it may be called coriandrol.

Occurrence

Both enantiomeric forms are found in nature: (S)-linalool is found, for example, as a major constituent of the essential oils of coriander (Coriandrum sativum L.), cymbopogon (Cymbopogon martini var. martinii), and sweet orange (Citrus sinensis) flowers. (R)-linalool is present in lavender (Lavandula officinalis), bay laurel (Laurus nobilis), and sweet basil (Ocimum basilicum), among others.

Each enantiomer evokes distinct neural responses in humans, so each is classified as possessing distinct scents. (S)-(+)-Linalool is perceived as sweet, floral, petitgrain-like (odor threshold 7.4 ppb) and the (R)-form as more woody and lavender-like (odor threshold 0.8 ppb).

Over 200 species of plants produce linalool, notably from the families Lamiaceae (mint and other herbs), Lauraceae (laurels, cinnamon, rosewood), and Rutaceae (citrus fruits), but also birch trees and other plants, from tropical to boreal climate zones. 

 Lavandula
 Cinnamomum tamala
 Cannabis sativa
 Basil
 Solidago
 Artemisia vulgaris (mugwort)
 Humulus lupulus

It was first synthesized in the laboratory of Leopold Ružička in 1919.

Biosynthesis
In higher plants linalool is formed by rearrangement of geranyl pyrophosphate (GPP). With the aid of linalool synthase (LIS), water attacks to form the chiral center. LIS appears to show a limonene synthase-type catalysis through a simplified "metal-cofactor-binding domain [where the majority] of the residues involved in substrate...binding [are] in the C-terminal part of the protein" suggesting stereoselectivity and the reasoning behind why some plants have varying levels of each enantiomer.

Odor and flavor
Linalool has complex odor and flavor properties. Its odor is similar to floral, spicy wood, somewhat resembling French lavender plants, bergamot oil or lily of the valley. It has a light, citrus-like flavor, sweet with a spicy tropical accent.  Linalool is used as a scent in 60% to 80% of perfumed hygiene products and cleaning agents, including soaps, detergents, shampoos, and lotions. It exhibits antimicrobial and antifungal properties.

Chemical derivatives
Linalool is hydrogenated to give dihydro- and tetrahydrolinalool, which are fragrances that are more resilient toward oxidants, as might be found in household cleaning products.  Linalyl acetate, a popular scent, is produced by esterification of linalool (as well as occurring naturally).  Isomerization of linalool gives geraniol and nerol.

Safety and potential toxicity
Linalool can be absorbed by inhalation of its aerosol and by oral intake or skin absorption, potentially causing irritation, pain and allergic reactions. Some 7% of people undergoing patch testing in Europe were found to be allergic to the oxidized form of linalool.

The US Food and Drug Administration (FDA) lists linalool in the Code of Federal Regulations under substances generally recognized as safe, synthetic flavoring substances and adjuvants.

See also 
 Lavender oil

References

External links 
 Comprehensive data sheet
 

Flavors
Tertiary alcohols
Plant toxin insecticides
Alkene derivatives
Monoterpenes
Perfume ingredients